Table of the Elements an American avant-garde record label created and owned by Jeff Hunt. Begun in 1993, the label’s 150-plus releases form a significant contemporary chronicle of American experimental music. 

Table of the Elements numbers its releases to correspond to symbols from the periodic table in increasing order of atomic weight, rather than using the traditional numerical system. It concentrates on re-released and specially recorded experimental music and minimal music, including many avant-garde musicians of the 20th and 21st centuries, such as John Cale, Tony Conrad, La Monte Young, Loren Mazzacane Connors, Derek Bailey, Rhys Chatham, Fushitsusha/Keiji Haino, Jim O'Rourke, Angus MacLise, Mats Gustafsson and Thurston Moore. The label’s archive contains over 15,000 CDs and LPs. The Table of the Elements Archive publishes the estate of Tony Conrad.

Table of the Elements has hosted multiple-day festivals.

Artists

 9 Beet Stretch (Leif Inge)
 Agathe Max
 Alastair Galbraith
 Alison Chesley
 AMM
 Angus MacLise
 Arkansaw Man
 Arnold Dreyblatt
 Ateleia
 Badgerlore
 Barbara Ess
 Belong
 Ben Vida
 Bernhard Günter
 Birchville Cat Motel
 BC Gilbert
 Captain Beefheart & His Magic Band
 CM von Hausswolff
 Christian Fennesz
 Collections of Colonies of Bees
 Davey Williams
 David Daniell
 David Grubbs
 Derek Bailey
 Eliane Radigue
 Erling Wold
 Faust
 Francisco López
 Fushitsusha
 Gastr del Sol
 Gate
 Hans Reichel
 Helen Money
 Henry Kaiser
 Jack Rose
 Jack Smith
 Jean-Marc Montera
 Jim O'Rourke
 John Cale
 John Fahey
 Jon Mueller
 Jonathan Kane
 Keiji Haino
 Keith Rowe
 KK Null
 La Monte Young
 LaDonna Smith
 Laurie Spiegel
 Lee Ranaldo
 Lichens
 Loren (Mazzacane) Connors
 Marian Zazeela
 Mats Gustafsson
 Megafaun
 Melissa St. Pierre
 Mike Kelley
 Neptune
 One Umbrella
 Oren Ambarchi
 Paul Panhuysen
 Pauline Oliveros
 Peggy Ahwesh
 Presocratics
 R. Keenan Lawler
 Radio Guitar
 Rafael Toral
 RLW (Ralf Wehowsky)
 Rhys Chatham
 Richard Youngs
 San Agustin
 School of Seven Bells
 Hubcap City
 Stephen O'Malley
 Terri Kapsalis
 Text of Light
 The Dream Syndicate
 Thunderboy!
 Thurston Moore
 Tony Conrad
 Transmission
 William Hooker
 Zeena Parkins

See also
 List of record labels

References

External links
Table of the Elements official site

American record labels
Experimental music record labels